Aberdeen was built by the Seattle Construction and Drydock Company in 1912 as a coastal whale catcher for the American Pacific Whaling Company operating out of Gray's Harbor from the Canada–United States border south to Cape Blanco in Oregon. Aberdeen  and a sister ship, Westport were launched in the spring of 1912 with Aberdeen  operational by May 1912 and reportedly already having caught "two monster whales." In 1917 Aberdeen was inspected and found suitable for naval service and prospectively assigned identification number ID-763. No record of actual acquisition by the United States Navy has been found.

The vessel is shown active 1930 through 1945 with American Pacific Whaling Company.

References

Bibliography

1912 ships
Whaling ships
Whaling in the United States